The 2010 season of Ellada Eheis Talento is the third season of the programme presented by Christos Ferentinos with judges Ilias Psinakis, Eugenia Manolidou and Vaggelis Perris.  Eugenia Manolidou was confirmed as a part of the judging panel, replacing Matthildi Maggira. In spite of the rumours, it was also confirmed that Christos Ferentinos will return for hosting the third season of the show. The audition episodes started on 19 March 2010. The semi-final episodes started on 30 April 2010. There were total of 4 semi-finals and a wild card round. The final of the show aired on 4 June 2010. It was won by 55-year-old singer Nikos Georgas, while comparisons had been noted by the judges and by the media as being analogous to the Susan Boyle of Greece.

Auditions
The application process took place throughout January and February 2010.

Semi-finals
The semi-final episodes started on 30 April 2010 and finished on 21 May.

Semi-finals summary

The "Order" columns list the order of appearance each act made for every episode.

Semi-final 1 (30 April)

Semi-final 2 (7 May)

Semi-final 3 (14 May)

Semi-final 4 (21 May)

Wild Card Show (28 May)
The Wild Card Show was held on 28 May and concludes four acts who came second on public votes, during the semi-finals and six judges pics. For judges pics, each judge had to choose two acts from the semi-finals. One act, who had made it into the Wild Card Show from the public votes, could not participate.

Wild Card Show summary
The "Order" columns list the order of appearance each act made for every episode.

Final (4 June)

The live final was held on Friday 4 June. Each of the acts performed in front of the judges and vying for the public vote.

Final summary

References

Greece
2010 Greek television seasons